Basilica di Santa Tecla was a former, paleo-Christian basilica church in Milan, region of Lombardy, Italy. It was originally established in 350 and demolished in 1458. Remnants of the structure have been excavated underneath the Milan Cathedral.

According to a number of historians the construction of the Basilica was ordered by Roman Emperor Constans in 345 under the name Basilica Maior. It was then founded in 350.

See also
 Early Christian churches in Milan

References 

Tecla
345 establishments
4th-century churches
4th-century establishments in Italy